Lin Ruey-shiung (born 17 December 1938) is a Taiwanese physician and professor in public health. He was the vice presidential nominee of the People First Party ticket for the 2012 Taiwan presidential race, running with James Soong. Prior to his vice presidential run, Lin never held political or elected office.

Academic career
A native of Tainan, Lin earned medical (M.D., 1965) and public health degrees (M.P.H., 1967) from National Taiwan University, a doctorate in epigenetics (Dr. Med., 1970) from the University of Heidelberg in Germany, and a Doctor of Public Health (Dr.P.H., 1977) degree from Johns Hopkins University in Baltimore, Maryland. He has taught at the National Taiwan University Medical School, the University of Kansas, and the University of Maryland. He was a professor at National Taiwan University's School of Public Health from 1985 to 2006 and served as the school's dean from 1987 to 1993.

2012 election
PFP chairman James Soong chose Lin to be his ticket's vice presidential nominee in late-September 2011. Lin, a political novice, had to renounce his American citizenship (he had held dual citizenship of the United States and the Republic of China) in order to be an eligible candidate.

Lin claimed that for three consecutive nights, beginning Sept. 20, his residence was attacked by electromagnetic waves and that he had to flee to a hotel.

References

External links
National Taiwan University Profile

1938 births
Living people
National Taiwan University alumni
Johns Hopkins University alumni
Heidelberg University alumni
People First Party (Taiwan) politicians
Former United States citizens
Taiwanese public health doctors
Politicians of the Republic of China on Taiwan from Tainan
Academic staff of the National Taiwan University
University System of Maryland faculty
Taiwanese expatriates in Germany
University of Kansas faculty
Scientists from Tainan
Taiwanese university and college faculty deans